The Life of Bakuvians and Their Movement Along the Velikokniaz Avenue is a 1900 Azerbaijani film directed by Q. Matye. It was filmed on November 12, 1900 the very day Matye shot Bakuvians Walk in the City Park. The film was released on November 19, 1900 in Baku. The film was shot on 35mm.

See also
List of Azerbaijani films: 1898-1919

1900 films
Azerbaijani silent films
Azerbaijani black-and-white films
Films of the Russian Empire
Russian silent films